Maison de Bonneterie was a chain of high-end fashion department stores in the Netherlands. The main branches were in Amsterdam and The Hague. Smaller branches in Laren and Heemstede had also existed. 

The Amsterdam store was founded in 1889 and was situated along the Kalverstraat and Rokin in a Parisian style building set around a top lit dome. The branch in The Hague was located in a centrally located building from 1913, in a style typical for the department stores built in many European cities during the same period. 

All stores closed on August 24, 2014.

External links
Official homepage thanking past customers
History in Dutch at Winkelstories.com

Buildings and structures in Amsterdam
Department stores of the Netherlands
Retail companies of the Netherlands
Defunct department stores